Common Recruitment Examination is an examination for the recruitment of civil servants in Hong Kong.  It consists of three 45-minute papers, namely Use of English (UE), Use of Chinese (UC) and Aptitude Test (AT). Candidates' results in the UE and UC papers are classified as 'Level 2', 'Level 1' or 'Fail', with 'Level 2' being the highest.  Results in the AT paper are classified as pass or fail.  'Level 2' and 'Level 1' results of the two language papers and the pass result of the AT paper are of permanent validity.  All three papers are in multiple-choice format.

References

External links
Official homepage

Examinations
Government recruitment
Hong Kong Government